Hulhudheli (Dhivehi: ހުޅުދެލި) is one of the inhabited islands of Dhaalu Atoll.

People of Hulhudheli are among the most skilled silversmiths in the Maldives.

Geography

Demography

References

Islands of the Maldives